World folk-epics are those epics which are not just literary masterpieces but also an integral part of the worldview of a people. They were originally oral literatures, which were later written down by either single author or several writers.

African languages 
 Bayajidda, a West African epic
 Eri, a West African epic
 Kebra Nagast, an Ethiopian epic
 Lianja, a Central African epic
 Mwindo, a Central African epic
 Oduduwa, a West African epic
 Silamaka, a West African epic
 Epic of Sundiata, a West African epic

American languages 
La Araucana, an American Spanish epic
Popol Vuh, a Maya K'ich'e epic
Diné Bahaneʼ, a Navajo epic

Southwest Asian languages 
Bahman Nama, a Persian epic about the story of Bahman son of Isfandyar
Banu Goshasp Nama, a Persian epic about the daughter of Rustam
Kush Nama, a Persian epic recounting the story of Kush the Tusked and Abtin.
Taghribat Bani Hilal, an Arabic epic recounting the journeys and conquests of the Bani Hilal tribe
The Daredevils of Sassoun or Davit of Sassoun. an Armenian folk epic
The Knight in the Panther's Skin, a Georgian epic poem
Epic of Gilgamesh, the oldest epic of the world from Mesopotamia
Faramarz Nama, a story about the Persian hero Faramarz
Garshasp Nama, a Persian epic about the hero Garshasp
Shahnameh, the Persian "Book of Kings" by Ferdowsi, national epic of Greater Iran and world's longest epic poetry written by one poet
The Book of One Thousand and One Nights, a collection of stories from mostly Persian and Arabic sources
The Hebrew Bible

East and Central Asian Languages 
Epic of King Gesar, a Tibetan epic, generally considered the longest in the world
Heike Monogatari (The Tale of the Heike), a Japanese epic
Jewang ungi, a Korean epic
King Dongmyeong, a Korean epic
 Irk Bitig, a book about Turkic legends from Dunhuang, China
Alpamysh, a Turkic epic from Central Asia
Alp Er Tunga an ancient epic from Turkic people
Manas, a Turkic epic from East Asia
Book of Dede Korkut (Korkut Ata), an epic from Turkmenistan, Kazakhstan, Azerbaijan, Turkey, Kyrgyzstan, Uzbekistan and other Turkic nations
Oghuz-nameh, an epic from Oghuz Turkic nations (Turkmenistan, Azerbaijan, and Turkey, as well as Turcomans of Iraq)
Kutadgu Bilig, an epic from Central Asia, Uighurs and other Turkic nations
Journey to the West (also known as "Monkey"), a Chinese novel
Mupamipa, an epic of the Lahu ethnic group of China
Olonkho, an epic from the Sakha people in Yakutia.

South Asian languages 
Khamba Thoibi Sheireng, a Meitei language epic poem, consisting of 39,000 lines, based on the story of Khamba and Thoibi, from India.
Meghnad Badh Kavya, a Bengali language epic from India by Michael Madhusudan Dutt.
Numit Kappa, a 1st-century Meitei language epic poetry from India.
Mahabharata, a Sanskrit epic from India; known as Bharatayuddha in Indonesia and the longest epic in the world.
Ramayana, a Sanskrit epic from India.
Panchatantra, a Sanskrit epic of animal folktales from India.
Epic of Siri, in Tulu language from Karnataka, India
The Five Great Epics of Tamil Literature, India:
Silappatikaram
Manimekalai
Cīvaka Cintāmaṇi
Valayapathi
Kundalakesi
Mailaralingana Kavya, in Kannada language, India
Manteswamy Kavya, in Kannada language, India
Malemahadeshwara kavya, in Kannada language, India
Sarala Mahabharata, an Odia language epic, India
Jagamohana Ramayana, an Odia language epic poem, India
Siri and Kotichennayya avali kavya, in Tulu language, Karnataka, India

Southeast Asian languages 
Hikayat Hang Tuah, a Malaccan, and Malay epic
Bidasari, a Malay epic
Biag ni Lam-Ang (Life of Lam-Ang), an epic of the Ilocano of northern Luzon, the Philippines
Darangen, an epic of the Maranao of Mindanao, the Philippines. Derived from the Ramayana
Hinilawod, an epic of the Panay-Bukidnons of Panay, the Visayas, central Philippines.
Ibalong Epic, a 60-stanza fragment of a Bicolano full-length folk epic of Bicol Region of the Philippines.
The Tale of Kiều, a Vietnamese epic poem in lục bát.
Ibong Adarna, a Spanish-era Tagalog epic
Klei khan Y Dam San, an epic of Rade people in Central Highland (Tây Nguyên), Vietnam.
Nagarakertagama, an Indonesian epic
Sepha Khun Chang Khun Phaen, a Thai epic about the adventures of Khun Phaen, a Siamese folk hero.
La Galigo, also known as Sureq Galigo or La Galigo, is an epic creation myth of the Buginese people from South Sulawesi, Indonesia Written in an Austronesian (Malayo-Polynesian) language, it is the longest epic in the world.
Lục Vân Tiên, a Vietnamese epic poem in lục bát.

European languages 

Cikli i Kreshnikëve, an Albanian epic
Kalevala, a Finnish epic
Kalevipoeg, an Estonian epic
Lāčplēsis, a Latvian epic

Greek language 
Iliad, an Ancient Greek epic
Odyssey, an Ancient Greek epic
On Jerusalem an epic written in Greek based on the Old Testament characters of Abraham, Isaac and Joseph
Theogony, an Ancient Greek epic

Italic and Romance Languages 
Aeneid, a Roman epic
Os Lusíadas, a Portuguese literary epic
The Lay of the Cid, a mediaeval Spanish epic
The Song of Roland, a mediaeval French epic

Celtic languages 
Mabinogion, a compilation of Welsh myths and legends
Matter of Britain, a compilation of Welsh myths and legends
Mythological Cycle, a compilation of Irish myths and legends
Ulster Cycle, a compilation of Irish myths and legends
Fenian Cycle, a compilation of Irish myths and legends
Cycles of the Kings, a compilation of Irish myths and legends
Táin Bó Cúailnge, an Irish epic
Caoineadh Airt Uí Laoghaire, an Irish lament

Germanic Languages
Beowulf, an Anglo-Saxon epic written in Old English
Edda, a collection of Icelandic poems
Le Morte d'Arthur, a collection of Arthurian legends in Middle English
Nibelungenlied, a German epic poem
Njál's saga, an Icelandic saga
Volsunga saga, a Scandinavian saga
The Lion of Flanders, a Flemish national epic

Slavic Languages 
The Baptism on the Savica, a Slovene literary epic
The Mountain Wreath, a Montenegrin epic poem
Epic of the Forgotten, a Bulgarian poetic saga
Judita, a Croatian epic
On the Track of the Sun – The Red Warriors from Chorasmia, a Croatian epic
Pan Tadeusz, a Polish literary epic
The Tale of Igor's Campaign, an East Slavic epic

Serbian language

See also 
List of epic poems
National epic
National myth
Founding myth

Epic poetry
Folklore
Lists of poems